is a district located in Shiga Prefecture, Japan.

As of 2003, the district has an estimated population of 34,262 and a density of 325.07 persons per km2. The total area is 105.40 km2.

Towns and villages

Current town
Aishō

Former towns
Aitō
Echigawa
Hatashō
Kotō

Mergers

On February 11, 2005 the towns of Aitō and Kotō merged with the towns of Eigenji and Gokashō, both from Kanzaki District, and the old city of Yōkaichi, to form the new city of Higashiōmi.
On February 26, 2006 the towns of Echigawa and Hatashō merged to form the new town of Aishō.

Districts in Shiga Prefecture